Chobani is an American food company specializing in strained yogurt. The company was founded in 2005 by Hamdi Ulukaya, a Turkish businessman. Chobani sells thick, Greek-style yogurt with a higher protein content than traditional yogurt and is one of the main companies to popularize this style of yogurt in the US. The company has also expanded to non-dairy, plant-based products such as dairy-free vegan yogurt and oat milk. Chobani produces a variety of Greek yogurt products, oat drinks, and snacks.  Chobani's yogurt's market share in the U.S. rose from less than 1% in 2007 to more than 20% in 2021, and is the top-selling Greek yogurt brand in the United States and operates the largest yogurt facility in the world.  In April 2016, Chobani announced it was giving 10 percent of its ownership stake to its employees.

Establishment and early years 
Chobani was founded in 2005 by the Turkish Kurd and businessman Hamdi Ulukaya. He chose the name Chobani as a variation of the Turkish word çoban, "shepherd".

Chobani was inspired by Ulukaya's childhood spent raising sheep and goats and making cheese with his family. Not impressed by the yogurt options available in the United States, Ulukaya made strained yogurt at his home in Upstate New York. He hired a yogurt master from Turkey, with whom he developed his own recipe. Using different bacterial cultures at differing temperatures and fermentation durations, they tested hundreds of recipes to come up with a yogurt with the desired taste, texture, and natural shelf life. Strained yogurt is thicker, creamier and tangier, with a higher protein content, as the whey is strained out. Ulukaya bought a plant in the town of South Edmeston, New York, that was being closed by Kraft Foods; Ulukaya purchased it with a Small Business Administration Loan. Ulukaya hired several of the former Kraft employees and launched his brand in 2007. In 2009, the chain stores Stop & Shop and ShopRite began carrying Chobani, and by the middle of 2009, Chobani was selling 200,000 cases a week. Later that same year, a major breakthrough came when the warehouse club stores BJ's Wholesale Club and Costco began carrying the brand. Ulukaya began adding new product lines to his brand in 2010. By 2010, Chobani realized over $1 billion in annual sales and became the leading seller of Greek yogurt in the U.S.

Later history and expansion
In November 2011, Chobani expanded into Victoria, Australia through the purchase of Victorian dairy company Bead Foods. It then invested $30m to expand the facility and began manufacturing from the Dandenong South plant in December 2012. In 2012, the brand opened its second plant in what became the world's largest yogurt facility in Twin Falls, Idaho, with an initial investment of $750 million. The move created approximately 7,000 jobs, and unemployment rates in the region dropped from 6.3% to 2.4%. Chobani also opened its first brick-and-mortar cafe in SoHo, New York City in July 2012.

Following the success of its product in Australia, in 2014 Chobani expanded its distribution to Asia and Latin America, beginning with Singapore, Malaysia, and Panama. The company announced plans for the Caribbean as well. In April 2014, Chobani reached a deal with private-equity firm TPG for a $750-million investment, which funded the company's expansion and the launch of a new line of products.  In 2014 the company launched Chobani Oats, a blend of Greek yogurt, steel-cut oats and fruit; Seasonal varieties, including watermelon and pink grapefruit; Chobani Indulgent, a dessert yogurt; and a 4%-fat plain Greek yogurt. Chobani introduced its products in Mexico in August 2016.

In 2017, Chobani surpassed Yoplait as the No. 2 manufacturer in overall yogurt. The company also announced a $20 million expansion of the Twin Falls plant, with a 70,000 square-foot facility and a new global research and development center. When Chobani was launched, Greek yogurt made up less than 1% of the yogurt market in the U.S. As of 2017, Greek yogurt accounted for 50% of U.S. yogurt sales. 

Chobani named in December 2020 that former finance chief of 8th Avenue Food & Provisions Jody Macedonio would be the company's new CFO.

In September 2022, Chobani withdrew its plans for an initial public offering of more than $10 billion citing current market conditions. It filed to go public in July 2021.

Products
Initial Chobani yogurt flavors included plain, vanilla, strawberry, peach, and blueberry. Later products included a yogurt-based condiment, plant-based beverages with organic oats as well as milk and cream from the company's yogurt-making process, four flavors of iced coffee, a nutritional shakes, and probiotic yogurt and drinks. Restaurants offering Chobani products include Tim Hortons.

Employees
Approximately 30% of Chobani's workforce consists of refugees and immigrants. In 2016, following reports on Chobani's practice of employing refugees, the company received calls for boycotts and death threats.

In April 2016, Chobani announced it was giving 10 percent of its ownership stake to its employees. The company allotted shares to its employees based on tenure, reportedly helping some of the company's longest serving employees become millionaires. In October 2016, the company announced that it was implementing a program to give six weeks of paid parental leave to new parents. In 2021, wages increased for the company's hourly workers, making up 70% of people employed by the company, from $13 to at least $15.

Community involvement and sponsorships

Philanthropy 
Since its founding, Chobani has been involved in philanthropic endeavors. The company's philanthropy focuses on improving childhood nutrition, strengthening the communities near its plants in New York and Idaho, and supporting those in need after major disasters in the U.S.

In the spring of 2018, CEO Hamdi Ulukaya appeared on The Ellen DeGeneres Show and Good Morning America to announce that the company was celebrating its 10th anniversary as a national brand by giving a Chobani yogurt to every person in America.

In November 2018, Chobani announced a new partnership with the national nonprofit Operation Homefront, with the aim of raising $1 million for America's military families for financial assistance and support. Chobani donated $500,000 and the company pledged to match up to $250,000 in additional donations facilitated by a new Chobani product called "Hero Batch" Red, White and Blueberry Greek yogurt, which was designed by military veterans at Chobani.

In May 2019, CEO Ulukaya pledged to pay the student lunch debt for all Warwick school district students in Rhode Island and urged other companies to step up to fight food insecurity across the country. 

In October 2019, Chobani launched a limited edition product, "Farmer Batch", with a portion of profits going to the American Farmland Trust (AFT).

Sponsorships
In 2012, Chobani became an official sponsor of the U.S. Olympic Team and premiered their first national commercial during the 2012 Summer Olympics opening ceremony.

Chobani Incubator 
Hamdi Ulukaya launched the Chobani Food Incubator in 2016 to support entrepreneurs at food and beverage startup companies with a nonequity investment, resources, mentorship and programming. In 2018, the company announced the creation of the Chobani Incubator Food Tech Residency. Participants in the incubator program have included Banza, Misfit Juicery, Chloe's Fruit, Pique Tea Crystals, NOKA, MatchaBar, and Ithaca Cold-Craftede.

In November 2019, the Chobani Incubator introduced its new Vets Cohort to help current and former armed service members who are also food entrepreneurs grow their business. The program was formed through a partnership with the Institute for Veterans and Military Families at Syracuse University.

Legal issues and product recalls
In 2013, Chobani was ordered to change their yogurt's labeling in England and Wales after a judge ruled that the wording "Greek yoghurt" (rather than Greek-style) misled consumers into thinking the yogurt was made in Greece (yogurt imported from Greece is sold in Britain, and is the only type sold as "Greek").

On September 3, 2013, Chobani pulled some of its Greek-style yogurt from supermarket shelves after hearing of "swelling or bloating" in cups. The company said it has investigated and found a type of mold commonly found in dairy that may be to blame. Chobani announced a voluntary recall on September 5 in cooperation with the FDA. On September 9, 2013, the FDA reported at least 89 people reported becoming sick after eating the yogurt.

References

External links

Chobani Official website

Brand name yogurts
Companies based in New York (state)
American brands
American companies established in 2005
Yogurt companies
American snack foods
Food manufacturers of the United States